Way Upstate and the Crippled Summer, pt. 2 is an EP by Frontier Ruckus, released in 2011 between the releases of Deadmalls & Nightfalls and Eternity of Dimming. It is only physically available on the double-vinyl edition of the former. The EP is the release by Frontier Ruckus most in the category of alternative country.

Track listing
All songs written by Matthew Milia
"Mona and Emmy"
"Winter and the Preacher's Daughter"
"Weeds and Life Among Them"
"Ogallala"
"Epiphanies and Revelations"

Personnel
Frontier Ruckus
Matthew Milia – lead vocals, guitar, pedal steel guitar, harmonica
David Winston Jones – banjo, voice
Ryan "Smalls" Etzcorn – drum kit, all percussion
Zachary Nichols – trumpet, singing-saw, melodica, alto horn, euphonium
Anna Burch – voice
Guest Musicians
Ryan Hay – piano, Hammond organ
John Krohn – bass guitar on tracks 1, 2, 4
Brian Barnes – bass on track 5

Production
Produced by Frontier Ruckus
Engineered and mixed by Jim Roll
Mastered by Jim Roll and John Krohn
Artwork and Design by Matthew Milia and Richard Maisano
Recorded and Mixed at Backseat Productions in Ann Arbor, Michigan mostly in April 2009, finished in early 2011

References

External links 
 

2011 EPs
Frontier Ruckus albums